Bringelly Shale is a component of the Wianamatta group of sedimentary rocks in the Sydney Basin of eastern Australia. Formed in the Triassic Period, it has an extensive outcrop in the western parts of Sydney. The shale has its greatest geographical extent at Bringelly, near the suburb of Liverpool.

Lithology
The shale is the topmost layer of sedimentary rock laid down by a river delta over the older Hawkesbury sandstone in the Triassic Period.

It is similar to Ashfield Shale in that both have low porosities, though differing in having a greater amount of calcareous, graywacke-type, lithic sandstone bands and lenses, carbonaceous claystone, siltstone, laminite, but would lack sideritic mudstone bands that Ashfield Shale has. Bringelly Shale has lumpy clay minerals, and it swells and decays rapidly on submergence in water and is generally less durable.

Description
The average thickness is around 60 metres. It was deposited in a swampy alluvial plain with winding streams that formed sporadic beds of sandstone. The shale is dark when unweathered just like the Ashfield Shale. The shale is usually a typical olive-green colour when weathered. Alloyed coal bands and lenses and iron oxide concretions have been observed in the shale. The shale is quarried in many western suburbs of Sydney for brick and miscellaneous ceramic manufacture.

See also

Hawkesbury sandstone
Ashfield Shale 
Wianamatta shale
Narrabeen Group

References

Geology of New South Wales
Geologic formations of Australia
Triassic Australia
Shale formations